Murayjimat Ibn Hamid is a town in the Madaba Governorate of northern Jordan.

References

Populated places in Madaba Governorate